A cauldron (or caldron) is a large pot (kettle) for cooking or boiling over an open fire, with a lid and frequently with an arc-shaped hanger and/or integral handles or feet. There is a rich history of cauldron lore in religion, mythology, and folklore.

Etymology 
The word cauldron is first recorded in Middle English as caudroun (13th century). It was borrowed from Norman caudron (Picard caudron). It represents the phonetical evolution of Vulgar Latin  *caldario for Classical Latin caldārium "hot bath", that derives from cal(i)dus "hot".

The Norman-French word replaces the Old English ċetel (German (Koch)Kessel "cauldron", Dutch (kook)ketel "cauldron"), Middle English chetel. The word "kettle" is a borrowing of the Old Norse variant ketill "cauldron".

History 
Cauldrons can be found from the late Bronze Age period - vast cauldrons with a capacity of 60-70 litres.

Symbolism and mythology
 
Cauldrons have largely fallen out of use in the developed world as cooking vessels. While still used for practical purposes, a more common association in Western culture is the cauldron's use in witchcraft—a cliché popularized by various works of fiction, such as William Shakespeare's play Macbeth. In fiction, witches often prepare their potions in a cauldron. Also, in Irish folklore, a cauldron is purported to be where leprechauns keep their gold and treasure.

In some forms of Wicca, appropriating aspects of Celtic mythology, the cauldron is associated with the goddess Cerridwen. Welsh legend also tells of cauldrons that were useful to warring armies. In the second branch of the Mabinogi in the tale of Branwen, Daughter of Llŷr, the Pair Dadeni (Cauldron of Rebirth) is a magical cauldron in which dead warriors could be placed and then be returned to life, save that they lacked the power of speech. It was suspected that they lacked souls. These warriors could go back into battle until they were killed again. In Wicca and some other forms of neopagan or pagan belief systems, the cauldron is still used in magical practices. Most often a cauldron is made of cast iron and is used to burn loose incense on a charcoal disc, to make black salt (used in banishing rituals), for mixing herbs, or to burn petitions (paper with words of power or wishes written on them). Cauldrons symbolize not only the Goddess but also represent the womb (because it holds something) and on an altar, it represents earth because it is a working tool. Cauldrons are often sold in New Age or "metaphysical" stores and may have various symbols of power inscribed on them.

The Holy Grail of Arthurian legend is sometimes referred to as a "cauldron", although traditionally the grail is thought of as a hand-held cup rather than the large pot that the word "cauldron" usually is used to mean. This may have resulted from the combination of the grail legend with earlier Celtic myths of magical cauldrons.

The common translation for ding is often referred to as a cauldron. In Chinese history and culture, possession of one or more ancient dings is often associated with power and dominion over the land. Therefore, the ding is often used as an implicit symbolism for power. The term "inquiring of the ding" (Chinese: 问鼎; pinyin: wèn dǐng) is often used to symbolize the use of divination or for the quest for power. One example of the ding cauldron and gaining power over the traditional provinces of China is the Nine Tripod Cauldrons (whether regarded as myth or history).

Archeologically intact actual cauldrons with apparent cultural symbolism include:
 the Gundestrup cauldron, made in the 2nd or 1st century BC, found at Gundestrup, Denmark
 a Bronze Age cauldron found at Hassle, Sweden
 the cauldron where the Olympic Flame burns for the duration of the Olympic Games

Cauldrons known only through myth and literature include:
 Dagda's Cauldron
 The Cauldron of Dyrnwch the Giant
 Pair Dadeni
 Cauldron of Hymir

Gallery

See also

 Chaldron, an obsolete spelling of 'cauldron', an English measure of dry volume. 
 Alfet
 Fire pot
 Eldhrímnir
 Gulyásleves
 Hassle
 Kama
 List of cooking vessels
 Olympic flame
 Potjiekos
 Sacrificial tripod

References 

 
Cooking vessels
Danish inventions
Magic items
Wiccan terminology
European witchcraft